Georgi and the Butterflies is a Bulgarian documentary film from 2004. It was directed by Andrey Paounov. The film won the "Silver Wolf" award at the International Documentary Film Festival Amsterdam.

Plot

The film tells the story of a man and his dream. This man is Dr Georgi Lulchev, a psychiatrist, neurologist, Chinese medicine man, administrator, amateur chef, entrepreneur and Director of a nursing home for people with intellectual disabilities located at Podgumer village. His dream is to build a farm located in the yard of the home, where the patients can take care of snails, ostriches and pheasants so they can  produce silk fibres and soybean food. This is a story full of optimism, snails, ostriches, silk, charity, the Eastern Orthodox Church, soybean food, schizophrenics, oligophrenics, psychopaths, Western hunters, misery, compassion, business and butterflies.

Reception
Variety gave it a positive review, noting that the documentary "is full of lovely touches; patients (never presented exploitatively) are introduced via their unique eating utensils, and music is marvelously used to suit each section."

Georgi and the Butterflies screened at more than 70 international film festivals and won numerous awards  including: Silver Wolf at  International Documentary Film Festival Amsterdam, Human Rights Award  at Sarajevo Film Festival,  Don Quixote Award  at Cracow Film Festival, Grand Prize at Mediawave, Audience Award at Trieste Film Festival etc. It was the first feature documentary to be released in Bulgarian cinema. The film was released theatrically across Europe by CinemaNet Europe in 2005.

References

External links 
 Auret, Charles (Sofia echo, Apr. 25, 2005)
 Doncheva, Gergana (Kino Kultura 2006)
 Documentary Campus NEWS
 Tenev, Georgi (Kultura Mar. 18 2005) In Bulgarian.

External links
 
 
 CinemaNet Europe

Bulgarian documentary films
2004 films
2004 documentary films
Media Wave Award winners
Documentary films about mental health
Films directed by Andrey Paounov